Teresa Bogucka (born April 1945, Zakopane, Poland) is a Polish journalist and writer, democratic opposition activist in Communist Poland.

Books
1997:Polak po komunizmie [The Pole after Communism], Znak, Kraków, Fundacja im. Stefana Batorego, Warsaw
2000: Cienie w ogrodzie [Shadows in the garden], Sic!, Warsaw
2002: Triumfujące profanum: telewizja po przełomie 1989 [Triumphing Profanity: Television of the Break of 1989], Sic!, Warsaw

Awards and recognition
2006: Officer's Cross of the Order of Polonia Restituta
2004: Kisiel Prize
1998 Her book Polak po komunizmie was nominated for the Nike Award
1991: Polish PEN Club Award

References

External links
Publications of Teresa Bogucka in Gazeta Wyborcza

1945 births
Living people
Polish journalists
Polish women journalists
Polish writers
Officers of the Order of Polonia Restituta
Polish dissidents
Polish anti-communists
People from Zakopane
20th-century Polish women